Stockholm International Fairs is a large exhibition facility that arranges trade fairs in Stockholm, Sweden.

History
The idea of starting a trade fair in Stockholm started with brothers Börje and Folke Claeson in 1942. 

Initially, the Royal Tennis Hall (Kungliga tennishallen) was rented for this purpose. In 1964, the City of Stockholm and Stockholm Chamber of Commerce took over as owners and operators. The main building was constructed in 1971 in the Älvsjö suburb of Stockholm Municipality.

Events
The facility has hosted international congresses, seminars, general assemblies and musical events. It played host to the 1975 Eurovision Song Contest and Melodifestivalen, the Swedish national selection, in Melodifestivalen 1996 and 1999.

Gallery

References

External links

Official website 

Infrastructure completed in 1971
1971 establishments in Sweden
Convention centres in Sweden
Buildings and structures in Stockholm
Music venues in Sweden
Event venues in Sweden
Fairgrounds